Spodnja Javoršica is a small settlement south of Vrhpolje in the Municipality of Moravče in central Slovenia. The area is part of the traditional region of Upper Carniola. It is now included with the rest of the municipality in the Central Slovenia Statistical Region.

References

External links
 
Spodnja Javoršica on Geopedia

Populated places in the Municipality of Moravče